The International Bibliography of the Social Sciences (IBSS) is a bibliography for social science and interdisciplinary research.  The database focuses on the social science disciplines of anthropology, economics, politics and sociology, and related interdisciplinary subjects, such as development studies, human geography and environment and gender studies. It was established in 1951 and prepared by the Fondation Nationale des Sciences Politiques in Paris. Production was transferred to the London School of Economics in 1989, and then to  ProQuest in 2010.

History 
IBSS was established in 1951 by the International Committee for Social Science Information and Documentation, a non-governmental organization recognised by UNESCO. From 1951 to 1989 it was prepared at the Fondation Nationale des Sciences Politiques in Paris and produced in four printed volumes: Economics, Political Science, Anthropology and Sociology. From 1989 to 2010 it was produced at the British Library of Political and Economic Science of the London School of Economics, with the help of funds from the Economic and Social Research Council (ESRC) from 1995 to 2009. It was purchased by ProQuest in January 2010, and production moved to ProQuest's UK headquarters in July that year. In 2016, production was transferred yet again, this time to Louisville, Kentucky.

It was made available in electronic format via CD-ROM in 1993; it became available online in 1995.

Coverage
IBSS includes approximately 2.7 million references to journal articles, books, reviews and selected chapters and is growing at the rate of about 100,000 items per year. Over 2800 current journals are regularly indexed, as well as 1415 ceased titles. Coverage extends from the present back to 1951. It also includes records for about 400,000 books, including 60,000 individual book chapters – 7,000 books are added each year. There is considerable international coverage; about 50% of the titles included are published outside the US or the UK, with about half of those in English and half in other languages.  About three-quarters of the current journal articles have abstracts.

Availability
The online database is available to institutional subscribers through the ProQuest database. It is not available to individual subscribers.  Print volumes are published annually by Routledge.

In the UK, the Economic and Social Research Council has paid for access by members of UK higher and further education institutions, ESRC-recognised research institutes and central government departments since 1955.

Online format 
Searches can be carried out by keyword, author or journal;  results can be printed, emailed, saved or downloaded into a bibliographic management software package. The database is updated weekly, and users can set up email alerts or RSS feeds of the new records added. A range of user guides and tutorials are available via the IBSS website.  There are links to the full text of articles for those in individual institutions that subscribe to them.

References

External links 
IBSS: International Bibliography of the Social Sciences at ProQuest
International Bibliography of the Social Sciences database at ProQuest

Bibliographic databases and indexes
Online databases
ProQuest